Celltrion Entertainment Co., Ltd. (formerly known as Dream E&M Co., Ltd.) is a South Korean production and artist management company under the Celltrion Group. It was founded on January 4, 2012.

In April 2017, the company merged with artist management agency Thespis Entertainment, owned by Lee Beom-soo.

Works

Television

Scripted

Non-Scripted

Film

Managed people

Actors
 Lee Beom-soo
 Park Soo-ah
 Shin Ji-hoon (ko)
 
 Kim Kang-hyun
 Lee Ho-cheol (ko)
 Hwang Hee
 Kim Soo-oh
 Park Sang-won

Writers
 Kim Do-hyun
 Kim Soo-jin
 Kim Hee-jae (ko)
 Nam Sun-nyeon
 Park Ji-sook
 Park Hyung-jin
 
 Yoo Bo-ra
 Yoon Hee-jung
 Lee Jae-gon
 Im Soo-mi
 Jang Young-chul
 Jung Kyung-soon
 
 Chae Seung-dae
 Heo Sung-hye
 Hwang Jin-young

References

External links
 

South Korean companies established in 2012
Mass media companies established in 2012
Entertainment companies of South Korea
Mass media companies of South Korea
Television production companies of South Korea
Film production companies of South Korea
Talent agencies of South Korea
Companies based in Seoul